Pharmacosycea is one of six subgenera currently recognised in the genus Ficus.  It was proposed by E. J. H. Corner in 1967 to unite section Pharmacosycea with Oreosycea.

Recent molecular phylogenies has shown that the subgenus is polyphyletic.  Section Pharmacosycea is a sister taxa to the rest of the genus Ficus, while section Oreosycea is itself polyphyletic.

Section Oreosycea
Section Oreosycea is Palaeotropical in distribution.

Subsection Glandulosae includes (not complete)
 Ficus asperula Bureau
 Ficus auriculigera Bureau
 Ficus austrocaledonica Bureau
 Ficus barraui Guillaumin
 Ficus bubulia C.C. Berg
 Ficus carinata C.C. Berg
 Ficus cataractorum Bureau
 Ficus crescentioides Bureau
 Ficus dzumacensis Guillaumin
 Ficus edelfeltii King
 Ficus mutabilis Bureau
 Ficus nervosa Heyne ex Roth

Subsection Pedunculatae includes
 Ficus albipila (Miquel) King - Abbey tree
 Ficus bataanensis Merrill
 Ficus callosa Willdenow
 Ficus capillipes Gagnepain
 Ficus vasculosa Miquel

Section Pharmacosycea
Section Pharmacosycea is Neotropical.  Cornelis Berg recognised two subsections: Bergianae and Petenenses.

Subsection Bergianae includes
 Ficus adhatodifolia Schott
 Ficus carchiana C.C. Berg
 Ficus crassiuscula Standl.
 Ficus gigantosyce Dugand
 Ficus insipida Willd. (subsp. insipida and subsp. scabra C.C. Berg)
 Ficus lapathifolia (Liebm.) Miq.
 Ficus mutisii Dugand,
 Ficus oapana C.C. Berg 
 Ficus obtusiuscula (Miq.) Miq.
 Ficus piresiana Vázq.Avila & C.C. Berg
 Ficus rieberiana C.C. Berg
 Ficus yoponensis Desv.

Subsection Petenenses includes
 Ficus apollinaris Dugand (= F. petenensis Lundell)
 Ficus ecuadorensis C.C. Berg 
 Ficus guajavoides Lundell,
 Ficus lacunata Kvitvik
 Ficus loxensis C.C. Berg
 Ficus macbridei Standl.,
 Ficus maxima Mill.
 Ficus maximoides C.C. Berg
 Ficus pulchella Schott
 Ficus tonduzii Standl.

References

Pharmacosycea
Plant subgenera